Stagmaturgis is a genus of moth in the family Gelechiidae. It contains the species Stagmaturgis catharosema, which is found in Brazil (Amazonas).

The wingspan is 9–10 mm. The forewings are blackish-fuscous with a small white spot or mark on the costa beyond the middle. There is also a small white apical spot. The hindwings are dark grey.

References

Gelechiinae